The lingual veins begin on the dorsum, sides, and under surface of the tongue, and, passing backward along the course of the lingual artery, end in the internal jugular vein.

The vena comitans of the hypoglossal nerve (ranine vein), a branch of considerable size, begins below the tip of the tongue, and may join the lingual; generally, however, it passes backward on the hyoglossus, and joins the common facial.

The lingual veins are important clinically as they are capable of rapid absorption of drugs; for this reason, nitroglycerin is given under the tongue to patients suspected of having angina pectoris.

Tributaries

 Sublingual vein
 Deep lingual vein
 Dorsal lingual veins
 Suprahyoid vein

External links
 Photo of model (frog)

References

 Moore NA and Roy W.  Rapid Review: Gross Anatomy. Elsevier, 2010.

Veins of the head and neck